The Woman Who Ran is a 2020 South Korean drama film written, produced, directed, edited and scored by Hong Sang-soo. It was selected to compete for the Golden Bear in the main competition section at the 70th Berlin International Film Festival. At Berlin, Hong Sang-soo won the Silver Bear for Best Director.

Cast
 Kim Min-hee as Gam-hee
Seo Young-hwa as Young-soon
 Song Seon-mi as Su-young
Kim Sae-byuk as Woo-jin
Lee Eun-mi as Young-jin
Kwon Hae-hyo as Mr. Jung
Shin Seok-ho as Cat Man
Ha Seong-guk as Young Poet
Darcy Paquet as Foreign audience member

Critical reception
According to the review aggregator Metacritic, which gave the film an average score of 79 out of 100 based on 10 critic reviews, the film received "generally favorable reviews". The site's critical consensus reads, "Narratively slight yet cumulatively absorbing, The Woman Who Ran finds writer-director Hong Sang-soo continuing to work in a beguilingly minor key."

References

External links
 
 

2020 films
2020 drama films
South Korean drama films
2020s Korean-language films
Films directed by Hong Sang-soo